Watkyn may refer to

Arthur Watkyn (Arthur Thomas Levi Watkins, 1907–1965), a British fiction writer
Sir Watkyn Bassett, a fictional character invented by P. G. Wodehouse, the father of Madeline Bassett